is an autobahn in southwestern Germany, connecting the A 1 with the A 6. It also connects numerous communities throughout the central Hunsrück.  The highway was constructed in the early or mid-1980s.

Exit list 

 

  
 

 

 
|-
|colspan="3"|

|-
|colspan="3"|

 

|}

External links 

62
A062
A062